Parry Sound Area Municipal Airport  is located  southeast of Parry Sound, Ontario, Canada.

This airport has served both the Parry Sound community and as a passage to the north since 1979. Located just north of the top of Lake Joseph, it also offers a fuel and rest point for pilots of smaller aircraft in the cottage country area. The airport offers food from its Wings Cafe, an addition since 2006. 

This local airport also invites the community for its Annual Fly-in and Drive-in, with activities such as ball-toss games, face-painting, live music, barbecue, and birds of prey exhibit.

See also
 List of airports in the Parry Sound area

References

Registered aerodromes in Parry Sound District